The 2015 CERH European Roller Hockey U-17 Championship was the 34th edition of the CERH European Roller Hockey Juvenile Championship. It was held in Luso (Mealhada), Portugal from 6 to 12 September 2015.
Portugal won its 13th title.

Standings

Results

See also
 Roller Hockey
 CERH European Roller Hockey Juvenile Championship

References

European Roller Hockey Juvenile Championship
2013 in Portuguese sport
2013 in roller hockey
International roller hockey competitions hosted by Portugal